Ram Malla, also known as Kshetra was the thirty-third king of Mallabhum. He ruled from 1185 to 1209 CE.

History
Ram Malla strengthened the military power of his state.

References

Sources
 

Malla rulers
Kings of Mallabhum
12th-century Indian monarchs
13th-century Indian monarchs
Mallabhum